Francis Fontaine (1845-1901) was an American Confederate soldier, plantation owner, newspaper editor, poet and novelist from the state of Georgia.

Early life
Francis Fontaine was born on May 7, 1845 in Columbus, Georgia. His father, John Fontaine (1792-1866), had served as the Mayor of Columbus from 1836 to 1837, and he was a planter. His mother was Mary Ann Stewart. He was educated at the Georgia Military Institute in Marietta, Georgia.

During the American Civil War of 1861-1865, he joined the Confederate States Army and served as a private and aide-de-camp. He fought at the Battle of Peachtree Creek.

Career
After the war, Fontaine inherited his father's plantations and managed them, becoming a planter in his own right.

In 1874, Fontaine co-founded The Columbus Times, a newspaper in his hometown of Columbus, Georgia. He then served as a state diplomat, encouraging European immigration to the state of Georgia. In 1877, he was elected to a convention to write the new state constitution.

In 1878, his poem entitled The Exile: A Tale of St. Augustine was published by G.P. Putnam's Sons. The theme of the poem was the massacre of Huguenots by Spanish forces in Florida in 1565. The poem received negative reviews from The New York Times and the Evening Post. He went on to publish three novels, including Etowah: A Romance of the Confederacy, which received good reviews from critics.

Personal life and death
Fontaine married Mary Flournoy in 1870, and they had a son and a daughter. In 1885, he remarried to Nathalie Hamilton. They resided in Atlanta, Georgia.

Fontaine died on May 3, 1901 in Atlanta, Georgia. He was buried at Lindwood Cemetery in Columbus, Georgia.

Bibliography

Poetry
The Exile: A Tale of St. Augustine (G.P. Putnam's Sons, 1878).

Non-fiction
The State of Georgia: What It Offers to Immigrants, Capitalists, Producers and Manufacturers, and Those Desiring to Better their Condition (1881).

Novels
Etowah: A Romance of the Confederacy (1887).
Amanda, the Octoroon (J. P. Harrison, 1891).
The Modern Pariah: A Story of the South (1892).

References

1845 births
1901 deaths
People from Columbus, Georgia
People from Atlanta
Confederate States Army soldiers
American planters
19th-century American poets
American male novelists
19th-century American novelists
American male poets
19th-century American male writers